CarSharing Association (CSA) is a federation of 25 carsharing organizations worldwide representing more than 4,000 shared vehicles and more than 125,000 member-drivers in total.  The goal of CSA is "to provide a respected authority and unified industry voice in order to support its members, their constituents and the communities in which they operate."

The Association works on industry standards, best practices; produces educational networking and conference events and advocates for public policy that is supportive of the shared-use mobility industry. The Association also promotes the Code of Ethics and Standards of Practice for round-trip, station-based carsharing operators.  CSA emphasizes sustainability, social and financial benefits, and integration with public transportation.

Member organizations
AutoShare
Buffalo CarShare
CarShareHFX
CarShare Vermont
Capital CarShare
City CarShare
City of Aspen
CityWheels
Coast Car Co-op
Communauto
Community Car
Community CarShare
eGo CarShare
Enterprise CarShare
GoGet
HOURCAR
I-GO Car Sharing
Ithaca Carshare
JuiceCar
JustShareIt
Modo the Car Co‐op
Peg City Car Co-op
Playcar Car Sharing
VRTUCAR
Zazcar

See also
Bundesverband CarSharing (Germany)

References

External links
 CSA Website

Organizations established in 2011
Carsharing